Ivan Vasilyevich Turchaninov; December 24, 1822 – June 18, 1901)  better known by his Anglicised name of John Basil Turchin, was a Union Army brigadier general in the American Civil War. He led two critical charges that saved the day at Chickamauga and was among the first to lead soldiers up Missionary Ridge. He was court-martialed for allowing his men to perpetrate the "Sack of Athens," and found guilty of all charges, but President Abraham Lincoln promoted him to brigadier general, which invalidated the verdict, as an officer could only be tried by those of equal or greater rank.

Early life and career
Ivan Turchin was born on December 24, 1822, or January 30, 1822, into a Don Cossack family in the Russian Empire. He entered the Russian Army in 1843, and graduated from the Imperial Military School in St. Petersburg in 1852. His father was a major in the Imperial Russian Army, which gained him entry into schools that led to his eventual military commission. He later served as a Colonel of Staff in the Russian Guards and fought in Hungary and in the Crimean War. While serving as a lieutenant, he took part in the Russian campaign to help the Austrian Empire suppress the Hungarian Revolution of 1848.

Following his graduation, Turchin was posted to the staff of Imperial Guards in St. Petersburg, under the command of Count F.V. Rudiger.
In May 1856, he married Nadezhda Lvov, the daughter of his commanding officer. Later that year, he and his wife emigrated to the United States, where he eventually settled in Chicago and worked for the Illinois Central Railroad.

Civil War
Turchin joined the Union army at the outbreak of the war in 1861 and became the colonel of the 19th Illinois Volunteer Infantry Regiment. Having led his regiment in Missouri and Kentucky, he soon found his unit under the command of Major General Don Carlos Buell in the newly organized Army of the Ohio. Buell was impressed by Turchin and promoted him to command a brigade in the Army of the Ohio's Third Division, commanded by Brigadier General Ormsby M. Mitchel.  Buell advanced southward into Kentucky and Tennessee in early 1862.

When Buell headed west to support Grant at the Battle of Shiloh, he left Mitchel to hold Nashville.  Turchin urged Mitchel to move southward.  Mitchel did so, but not because of Turchin.  He took Huntsville, Alabama, as part of a plan with the spy James J. Andrews to capture Chattanooga by cutting it off from Confederate reinforcements.  Mitchel blocked them from the west by capturing Huntsville. Andrews was to block them from the south by burning bridges on the Western and Atlantic line.  Unfortunately, Andrews failed; after the Great Locomotive Chase, all the raiders were captured, and some, including Andrews, were executed.  Nonetheless, Mitchell continued to occupy the line westward from Chattanooga throughout much of northern Alabama.

The occupation of northern Alabama by this division of the Union Army led to attack by combined partisan and Confederate cavalry units.  One such attack overran one of Turchin's regiments at Athens, Alabama.  Frustration had been building among these Union soldiers for weeks over repeated attacks and Buell's clearly stated conciliatory policy of protecting the rights and property of Southerners.  The reported involvement of local citizens in the rout at Athens and the humiliation suffered by the Union soldiers led to the sacking of the town when Turchin brought up reinforcements.  According to University of New Mexico School of Law professor Joshua E. Kastenberg, Southern civilians had fired on Turchin's men.  General Joseph Keifer, who served as an ad hoc judge advocate, stated "Turchin did not believe that war could be successfully waged by an invading army with its officers and soldiers acting as missionaries of mercy."

After reoccupying the town on May 2, 1862, Turchin assembled his men and reportedly told them, "I shut my eyes for two hours. I see nothing."  He did in fact leave the town to reconnoiter defensive positions, during which time his men ransacked the business district.  The incident was controversial, and Lost Cause supporters vilified Turchin.  

When word reached General Buell, a man much detested by the soldiers, he insisted on court-martialing Turchin. The court proceedings received national attention and became a focal point for the debate on the conduct of the war, related to the conciliatory policy as Union casualties in the war mounted. 

On February 25, 1862, Buell had issued a general order commanding his soldier "to protect the dignity of civilians." As Professor Kastenberg has noted, while Turchin may not have been concerned with the law or war, he certainly was "on notice" of Buell's order.  Turchin, according to Kastenberg, had another problem at his court-martial. He requested Colonel Carter Gazlay to serve as his defense counsel, which was unusual since defense counsel was not a right at the time, and Gazlay faced his own court-martial for theft of army property. Also, as Kastenberg points out, Brigadier General James Garfield wrote to Secretary of War Edwin Stanton, "I cannot sufficiently give utterance to my horror of the ravages, outrages, that have been committed… this town was, by Col Turchin, given up to pillage." Turchin was ultimately spared an ignominious end because Buell was removed from command for his incompetence.

There were three charges against Turchin. He was first accused of "neglect of duty." According to the recitations, there were over twenty or so instances in which Turchin supposedly ordered his soldiers to pillage and plunder Athens, Alabama, without any proper restraints to them. Such instances included the sexual abuse of a servant [meaning slave] girl and the utter decimation of Bibles and testaments, ruthlessly destroyed and burned to pieces in a shop. Many of the other allegations against him included the plundering of ten stores and nine homes. "The rape served as the ultimate example of Turchin's failure" to control his own troops. Under the second charge, Turchin failed to conduct himself in a manner expected of an officer and a gentleman. That mattered to General Buell because under "Article 83 conviction meant automatic dismissal from the service and the end of Turchin's military career." A specification added to this charge included a failure to pay the bill at a hotel. The third charge was a failure to obey orders. It was believed that if Turchin were convicted on that charge, it would send a clear message to the officers in the Army of the Ohio and instill discipline and order within the ranks of the army. When the court-martial began, Garfield had been under the impression that Turchin allowed the things that took place at Athens in accordance with Muscovite custom.

Turchin was found guilty of all charges, but the member of the court-martial urged Buell to show clemency. Buell instead ordered he be dismissed from the army. However, Turchin's wife and others acted on his behalf in Washington, and were able to get Secretary of War Edwin Stanton to recommend his promotion to brigadier general.  President Abraham Lincoln promoted him in mid-July. This invalidated the verdict: an officer could only be tried by those of equal or greater rank, and Turchin now outranked six of the seven members of the court.

Turchin received a hero's welcome upon his return to Chicago.  Prominent figures called for the removal of Buell and a more aggressive conduct of the war to bring it to a swift end.  Turchin was given command of a new brigade.  He distinguished himself during the battles of Chickamauga and Chattanooga, and in the Atlanta Campaign.

Turchin's wife, known in the army as Madame Turchin, always stood by him and followed her husband on the field during his campaigns, witnessing the battles (as at Chickamauga and at the Battle of Missionary Ridge), and writing the only woman's war diary of the military campaigns.

The song "Turchin's got your mule" (stemming from the catchphrase "Here's your mule") was popular during the war, and its chorus is said to have been used by disheartened troopers as a derisive answer to General Braxton Bragg's endearments at Missionary Ridge.

Turchin resigned from service in October 1864 after suffering heatstroke on the campaign.

Postbellum career and legacy

Turchin returned to Chicago and worked for a time as a patent solicitor and civil engineer. He later was involved in real estate and the settlement of immigrants in southern Illinois. In 1900, he was awarded a pension under a private pension act approved by Congress. He suffered severe dementia, attributed to his heatstroke, and died penniless in an institution in Anna, Illinois, at the age of 79. He is buried next to his wife in the Mound City National Cemetery in southern Illinois.

Turchin has been portrayed by many in the South as a villainous figure for the so-called "Rape of Athens," but his actions presaged those that other Union commanders, particularly William Tecumseh Sherman, would adopt in prosecuting total war against the Confederate States.

See also

 List of American Civil War generals (Union)

Notes

References
 Bradley, George C., and Dahlen, Richard L., From Conciliation to Conquest.  The Sack of Athens and the Court-Martial of Colonel John B. Turchin (U of Alabama, 2006)  
 Casstevens, Frances Harding. Tales from the North and the South: Twenty-Four Remarkable People and Events of the Civil War. Jefferson, NC.: McFarland & Co., 2007.  
 Chicoine, Stephen, John Basil Turchin and the Fight to Free the Slaves (Praeger, 2003)  
 Cozzens, Peter. This Terrible Sound: The Battle of Chickamauga. Urbana: University of Illinois Press, 1992.  
 East, Ernest E. "Lincoln's Russian General", Journal of the Illinois State Historical Society, Vol. 52, No. 1, Lincoln Sesquicentennial (Spring, 1959), pp. 106–122 
 Haynie, J. Henry.  The Nineteenth Illinois: A Memoir of the Regiment of Volunteer Infantry Famous in the Civil War of Fifty Years Ago for Its Drill, Bravery, and Distinguished Services. (M.A. Donohue & Co., 1912) 
 Mcelligott, Mary Ellen. "A Monotony Full of Sadness": The Diary of Nadine Turchin, May, 1863–April, 1864", Journal of the Illinois State Historical Society, Vol. 70, No. 1 (Feb., 1977), pp. 27–89 
 Treichel, James A. Union Cossack: General John B. Turchin's Career in the American Civil War. Thesis (M.A.), Marquette University, 1962.

External links
 
  From Conciliation to Conquest, the book on the Turchin Court Martial
 Turchin biography: John Basil Turchin and the Fight to Free the Slaves
 The Tale of Ivan Turchaninov
 Ivan Turchaninov, Union's Russian General

1822 births
1901 deaths
Union Army generals
United States Army personnel who were court-martialed
Russian military personnel of the Crimean War
American Cossacks
Don Cossacks
Emigrants from the Russian Empire to the United States
People from Chicago
People from Union County, Illinois
People of Illinois in the American Civil War